Marc-Antoine Lemire (born 1990) is a Canadian film director. He is most noted for his 2017 short film Pre-Drink, which won the Toronto International Film Festival Award for Best Canadian Short Film at the 2017 Toronto International Film Festival, and the Prix Iris for best Fiction Short Film at the 20th Quebec Cinema Awards.

A graduate of the film studies program at the Université du Québec à Montréal, he won the Prix du meilleur espoir en cinéma documentaire in 2013 for his documentary film Ces trottoirs où nous marchons.<ref>"Cinéma documentaire : Marc-Antoine Lemire reçoit le Prix du meilleur espoir". Actualités UQAM, June 14, 2013.</ref> He made the short films Plaisirs de table (2012) and Joséphine, ou Chat échaudé craint l'eau froide (2013) before breaking through to wider attention with his 2015 short film Inner Jellyfishes (Les Méduses)'', which screened at film festivals across Canada and internationally. En 2022, il réalise son premier long-métrage, "Mistral Spatial (2022)"

He has also worked in the art department for other films as an art director and propmaster.

References

External links

1990 births
Canadian male screenwriters
Film directors from Montreal
Writers from Montreal
Canadian screenwriters in French
21st-century Canadian male writers
Canadian LGBT screenwriters
LGBT film directors
Canadian gay writers
French Quebecers
Université du Québec à Montréal alumni
Living people
21st-century Canadian screenwriters
Gay screenwriters
21st-century Canadian LGBT people